Outer Space Jitters is a 1957 short subject directed by Jules White starring American slapstick comedy team The Three Stooges (Moe Howard, Larry Fine and Joe Besser). It is the 182nd entry in the series released by Columbia Pictures starring the comedians, who released 190 shorts for the studio between 1934 and 1959.  The supporting cast for this short features Dan Blocker as a creature from outer space.

Plot
The Stooges tell their infant sons (also the Stooges) a story about the time they blasted to outer space. In this story, the Stooges are assistants to Professor Jones (Emil Sitka) who travel to the planet Sunev (Venus spelled backwards). The planet's leader, the Grand Slitz of Sunev (Gene Roth) greets them cordially enough, but it soon becomes apparent that he has plans to bring prehistoric men to life and take over the planet Earth. No sooner does Professor Jones catch onto the Grand Slitz's plan does he end up being tied up.

In the interim, the Stooges engage in some flirtatious activity with several Sunevian girls (Harriette Tarler, Diana Darrin, and Arline Hunter). At dinner, an alien leader, known officially as The High Mucky Muck (Philip Van Zandt) tells the Stooges to eat heartily and enjoy their meal, for it will be their last. The trio make a quick dash for the spaceship, but not before encountering a prehistoric goon (Dan Blocker, mistakenly billed as "Don Blocker"). The boys manage to free Professor Jones and destroy the equipment that would have conquered the Earth. The stooges return to earth, finishing their story, until the baby sitter, a female goon arrives, causing the stooges to jump out the window.

Cast
 Joe Besser as Joe / Joe's Son (as Joe)
 Larry Fine as Larry / Larry's Son (as Larry)
 Moe Howard as Moe / Moe's Son (as Moe)
 Emil Sitka as Professor Jones
 Gene Roth as The Grand Zilch
 Philip Van Zandt as The High Mucky Muck
 Dan Blocker as The Goon (as Don Blocker)
 Diana Darrin as Sunev Girl (uncredited)
 Arline Hunter as Sunev Girl (uncredited)
 Joe Palma as Captain Tsimmis (uncredited)
 Harriette Tarler as Sunev Girl (uncredited)

Production notes
Outer Space Jitters was filmed on July 25–26, 1957. Outer Space Jitters features Moe and Larry's more "gentlemanly" haircuts, first suggested by Joe Besser. These had to be used sparingly, as most of the shorts with Besser were remakes of earlier films, and new footage had to be matched with old. In Outer Space Jitters, however, Larry's frizz is combed back, while Moe retained his sugarbowl bangs. This seeming inconsistency (which would occur in future films) accommodated the gag of a frightened Moe with hair standing on end.

This short marks one of the few moments where one of the Stooges breaks the fourth wall. As the professor and The Three Stooges are being introduced to the leader of Sunev, Larry says, "And don't forget to see Pal Joey, folks." This is a reference to the film of the same name that was released two months earlier.

See also
 List of American films of 1957

References

External links 
 
 
 Outer Space Jitters at threestooges.net

1957 films
1950s science fiction comedy films
The Three Stooges films
American black-and-white films
American science fiction comedy films
American space adventure films
Films directed by Jules White
Columbia Pictures short films
1957 comedy films
1950s English-language films
1950s American films